Suleman Abdul Rahman (born 19 October 1942) is an Ethiopian former cyclist. He competed in the individual road race at the 1972 Summer Olympics.

References

External links
 

1942 births
Living people
Ethiopian male cyclists
Olympic cyclists of Ethiopia
Cyclists at the 1972 Summer Olympics
Place of birth missing (living people)
20th-century Ethiopian people